"Trust Nobody" is a song by Norwegian DJ and record producer Cashmere Cat, featuring vocals by American singer Selena Gomez and Canadian singer Tory Lanez. It was released on 30 September 2016 as the second single from Cashmere's debut studio album, 9 (2017). The track was written by Cashmere Cat, Starrah, Lanez, Gomez, Benny Blanco, and Frank Dukes. It was produced by Cashmere Cat, Blanco and Dukes.

Music video
The videoclip of the song was released on 16 November 2016. It was directed by Jake Schreier and starring five dancers Jasmin Williams, Talia Koylass, Raphael Thomas, Dominique McDougal and Wally Pham dancing on a stage built in the desert.

Credits and personnel
Cashmere Cat – songwriter, producer
Selena Gomez – featured vocals, songwriter
Tory Lanez – featured vocals, songwriter
Benny Blanco – songwriter, producer
Frank Dukes – songwriter, producer
Starrah – songwriter
Chris "Tek" O'Ryan - vocal producer, engineer

Charts

Certifications

References

External links

2016 songs
2016 singles
Interscope Records singles
Selena Gomez songs
Tory Lanez songs
Songs written by Benny Blanco
Songs written by Frank Dukes
Songs written by Selena Gomez
Songs written by Cashmere Cat
Songs written by Starrah
Song recordings produced by Benny Blanco
Song recordings produced by Cashmere Cat
Cashmere Cat songs
Songs written by Tory Lanez
Song recordings produced by Frank Dukes